Patricio Cornejo Seckel (born 6 June 1944) is a retired Chilean professional tennis player of the 1970s. He competed at the 1975 Davis Cup with Jaime Fillol and played the longest Davis Cup rubber in terms of games, eventually losing to Stan Smith/Erik van Dillen from the US team 9–7, 39–37, 6–8, 1–6, 3–6 in the 1973 American Zone Final. The second set is the world record for the most games in a Davis Cup set.

Cornejo retired from professional tennis in 1983 but still continues to play socially and in charity tournaments.

Career finals

Doubles (8 titles, 10 runner-ups)

External links
 
 
 

Chilean male tennis players
Tennis players from Santiago
1944 births
Living people
Tennis players at the 1967 Pan American Games
Pan American Games competitors for Chile
20th-century Chilean people